"Angel Child" is a traditional song from the Texas repertoire. The song was recorded by Memphis Slim (1948), Lightnin' Hopkins and Mance Lipscomb, and Guitar Slim Green.

References

 

 

Year of song unknown
Memphis Slim songs
1948 singles
Songwriter unknown